An Announcement to Answer is Quantic's fourth album.

Track listing 
 "Absence Heard, Presence Felt" -  3:07 
 "An Announcement To Answer" -  4:53 
 "Blow Your Horn" -  4:21 
 "Bomb In A Trumpet Factory" -  2:44 
 "Politick Society" -  4:40 
 "Meet Me At The Pomegranate Tree" -  2:50 
 "Sabor" -  6:59 
 "Ticket to Know Where" -  4:06 
 "Tell It Like You Mean It" -  4:51

References

Announcement to Answer, An
Will Holland albums
Breakbeat albums